The Rhodes House or Henry A. and Birdella Rhodes House is listed on the National Register of Historic Places. Henry Rhodes had Ambrose J. Russell and Frederick Heath design and build the house in 1901.

See also
Rhodes Brothers
Rhodesleigh (another mansion)

References

Houses completed in 1901
National Register of Historic Places in Tacoma, Washington
Queen Anne architecture in Washington (state)
Frederick Heath buildings
Buildings and structures in Tacoma, Washington
Houses on the National Register of Historic Places in Washington (state)
Houses in Pierce County, Washington